The Williamson ether synthesis is an organic reaction,  forming an ether from an organohalide and a deprotonated alcohol (alkoxide). This reaction was developed by Alexander Williamson in 1850. Typically it involves the reaction of an alkoxide ion with a primary alkyl halide via an SN2 reaction. This reaction is important in the history of organic chemistry because it helped prove the structure of ethers.

The general reaction mechanism is as follows:

An example is the reaction of sodium ethoxide with chloroethane to form diethyl ether and sodium chloride:

C2H5Cl + C2H5ONa -> C2H5OC2H5 + NaCl

Mechanism
The Williamson ether reaction follows an SN2 bimolecular nucleophilic substitution mechanism. In an SN2 reaction mechanism there is a backside attack of an electrophile by a nucleophile and it occurs in a concerted mechanism (happens all at once). In order for the SN2 reaction to take place there must be a good leaving group which is strongly electronegative, commonly a halide.

In the Williamson ether reaction there is an alkoxide ion (RO−) which acts as the nucleophile, attacking the electrophilic carbon with the leaving group, which in most cases is an alkyl tosylate or an alkyl halide. The leaving site must be a primary carbon, because secondary and tertiary leaving sites generally prefer to proceed as an elimination reaction. Also, this reaction does not favor the formation of bulky ethers like di-tertbutyl ether, due to steric hindrance and predominant formation of alkenes instead.

Scope
The Williamson reaction is of broad scope, is widely used in both laboratory and industrial synthesis, and remains the simplest and most popular method of preparing ethers. Both symmetrical and asymmetrical ethers are easily prepared. The intramolecular reaction of halohydrins in particular, gives epoxides.

In the case of asymmetrical ethers there are two possibilities for the choice of reactants, and one is usually preferable either on the basis of availability or reactivity. The Williamson reaction is also frequently used to prepare an ether indirectly from two alcohols. One of the alcohols is first converted to a leaving group (usually tosylate), then the two are reacted together.

The alkoxide (or aryloxide) may be primary and secondary. Tertiary alkoxides tend to give elimination reaction because of steric hindrance. The alkylating agent, on the other hand is most preferably primary. Secondary alkylating agents also react, but tertiary ones are usually too prone to side reactions to be of practical use. The leaving group is most often a halide or a sulfonate ester synthesized for the purpose of the reaction. Since the conditions of the reaction are rather forcing, protecting groups are often used to pacify other parts of the reacting molecules (e.g. other alcohols, amines, etc.)

The Williamson ether synthesis is a common reaction in the field of Organic Chemistry in industrial synthesis and in undergraduate teaching laboratories. Yields for these ether syntheses are traditionally low when reaction times are shortened, which can be the case with undergraduate laboratory class periods. Without allowing the reactions to reflux for the correct amount of time (anywhere from 1–8 hours from 50 to 100 °C) the reaction may not proceed to completion generating a poor overall product yield. To help mitigate this issue microwave-enhanced technology is now being utilized to speed up the reaction times for reactions such as the Williamson ether synthesis. This technology has transformed reaction times that required reflux of at least 1.5 hours to a quick 10-minute microwave run at 130 °C and this has increased the yield of ether synthesized from a range of 6-29% to 20-55% (data was compiled from several different lab sections incorporating the technology in their syntheses).

There have also been significant strides in the synthesis of ethers when using temperatures of 300 °C and up and using weaker alkylating agents to facilitate more efficient synthesis. This methodology helps streamline the synthesis process and makes synthesis on an industrial scale more feasible. The much higher temperature makes the weak alkylating agent more reactive and less likely to produce salts as a byproduct. This method has proved to be highly selective and especially helpful in production of aromatic ethers such as anisole which has increasing industrial applications.

Conditions
Since alkoxide ions are highly reactive, they are usually prepared immediately prior to the reaction, or are generated in situation. In laboratory chemistry, in situ generation is most often accomplished by the use of a carbonate base or potassium hydroxide, while in industrial syntheses phase transfer catalysis is very common. A wide range of solvents can be used, but protic solvents and apolar solvents tend to slow the reaction rate strongly, as a result of lowering the availability of the free nucleophile. For this reason, acetonitrile and N,N-dimethylformamide are particularly commonly used.

A typical Williamson reaction is conducted at 50 to 100 °C and is complete in 1 to 8 h. Often the complete disappearance of the starting material is difficult to achieve, and side reactions are common. Yields of 50–95% are generally achieved in laboratory syntheses, while near-quantitative conversion can be achieved in industrial procedures.

Catalysis is not usually necessary in laboratory syntheses. However, if an unreactive alkylating agent is used (e.g. an alkyl chloride) then the rate of reaction can be greatly improved by the addition of a catalytic quantity of a soluble iodide salt (which undergoes halide exchange with the chloride to yield a much more reactive iodide, a variant of the Finkelstein reaction). In extreme cases, silver compounds such as silver oxide may be added:

The silver ion coordinates with the halide leaving group to make its departure more facile. Finally, phase transfer catalysts are sometimes used (e.g. tetrabutylammonium bromide or 18-crown-6) in order to increase the solubility of the alkoxide by offering a softer counter-ion.
One more example of etherification reaction in the tri-phasic system under phase transfer catalytic conditions is the reaction of benzyl chloride and furfuryl alcohol.

Side reactions
The Williamson reaction often competes with the base-catalyzed elimination of the alkylating agent, and the nature of the leaving group as well as the reaction conditions (particularly the temperature and solvent) can have a strong effect on which is favored. In particular, some structures of alkylating agent can be particularly prone to elimination.

When the nucleophile is an aryloxide ion, the Williamson reaction can also compete with alkylation on the ring since the aryloxide is an ambident nucleophile.

See also
 Ullmann condensation for the formation of bis-aryl ethers
 Dimethyl sulfate and Diethyl sulfate, relatively inexpensive organosulfates used in alternative ether synthesis methods

References

Substitution reactions
Carbon-heteroatom bond forming reactions
Name reactions